Pedro Armella (born 13 May 1930) is an Argentine former sports shooter. He competed in the 300 metre rifle, three positions and the 50 metre rifle, three positions events at the 1960 Summer Olympics.

References

1930 births
Living people
Argentine male sport shooters
Olympic shooters of Argentina
Shooters at the 1960 Summer Olympics
Pan American Games gold medalists for Argentina
Pan American Games silver medalists for Argentina
Pan American Games medalists in shooting
Sportspeople from Entre Ríos Province
Shooters at the 1955 Pan American Games
Shooters at the 1959 Pan American Games
20th-century Argentine people